One Plum Blossom is a 1984 TV series shown on Taiwan's China Television, starring Shen Hai-jung and Kou Shih-hsiun and set in 1930s China. It aired 25 episode from December 17, 1984, to January 18, 1985, every Monday to Friday evening at 8.00 pm.

Two remakes of the drama have been made: Grief Over QingHe River (2000) starring Jiang Qinqin and Vincent Zhao, and New One Plum Blossom (2009) starring Lu Yi and Wallace Huo.

Theme
The theme song, Yi jian mei, was sung by Taiwanese singer Fei Yu-ching.

Plot
The fiery Shen Xin Ci runs away from her psychopathic fiancé, Liang Yong Chang, after finding out the truth. On the way she meets Zhao Shi Jun, who sympathizes with her and gives her some money to pay off her father's medical bills. After the death of her father, Xin Ci decides to find Shi Jun and repay his kindness, no matter the request.

For the sake of the water supply and to make peace between the two towns, ShaHeZheng and WanJiaZhuang, Zhao Shi Jun are forced to marry Mayor Wan's daughter, Wan Qiu Ling. On the way back to her new home Qiu Ling, who has been seriously ill since childhood, falls sick but is rescued by a mysterious doctor, Liang Yong Chang. He tells her that her disease can be cured, but she will not be able to give birth to a child in the future. Desperate to keep the family going, Qiu Ling takes Yong Chang's advice and she drugs her husband and switches places with another girl, so that the girl can get pregnant instead of her.

What Liang Yong Chang did not count on was that the other girl would turn out to be his runaway fiancée, Shen Xin Ci. So Yong Chang out to seek revenge on Zhao Shi Jun and everyone that is in his way, resulting in tragic death of Xin Ci.

Later versions

Grief Over QingHe River
Grief Over QingHe River is a 2000 remake with 30 episodes, starring Jiang Qinqin and Vincent Zhao.

It was shot entirely in Mainland China. Compared to the 1984 original series, the main origins of the story had not changed.

New One Plum Blossom
New One Plum Blossom is a 2009 remake consisting of 40 episodes and starring Lu Yi and Wallace Huo. It was also shot in Mainland China.

Although the names of the characters and the origins of the story (ShaHeZheng and WanJiaZhuang's water source conflict) in this remake are the same as the original series, many new elements were added to the story, including the development of the characters and their relationships, resulting in a relatively different plot from the previous version.

See also
A Spray of Plum Blossoms

References

1980s Taiwanese television series
Television series set in the 1930s
Chinese-language television shows